WGCH (1490 AM, "News Talk AM 1490") is a radio station licensed to serve Greenwich, Connecticut.  The station is owned by Rocco and Susan Forte, through licensee Forte Family Broadcasting, Inc. It airs a News/Talk format.

The station was assigned the WGCH callsign by the Federal Communications Commission in 1964.

References

External links
 

 
 

GCH
Radio stations established in 1964
1964 establishments in Connecticut